.ls is the Internet country code top-level domain (ccTLD) for Lesotho.

Second-level domains

Registration to  .ls domains are provided through accredited registrars. 

There are also registrations on third level as shown below.

History

The .ls domain was established and first delegated on 13 January 1993, with the National University of Lesotho as the sponsoring authority.  Initially, Rhodes University acted as the registry and hosted the primary name server, a situation that continued until September 2012.

In April 2012, the sponsoring authority changed from the National University of Lesotho to the Lesotho Communications Authority, the national communications regulator, in line with the newly promulgated Communications Act (No. 4 of 2012). In January 2016, a non-profit company, the Lesotho Network Information Centre (LsNIC) was established to take over registry operations. Re-delegation of the zone was completed by IANA in March 2017.

External links
 IANA .ls whois information
 Lesotho Communications Authority

Country code top-level domains
Communications in Lesotho

sv:Toppdomän#L